This page lists all described species of the spider family Deinopidae accepted by the World Spider Catalog :

Asianopis

Asianopis Lin & Li, 2020
 A. aruensis (Roewer, 1938) — Indonesia (Aru Is.)
 A. celebensis (Merian, 1911) — Indonesia (Sulawesi)
 A. dumogae (Merian, 1911) — Indonesia (Sulawesi)
 A. goalparaensis (Tikader & Malhotra, 1978) — India
 A. konplong (Logunov, 2018) — Vietnam
 A. liukuensis (Yin, Griswold & Yan, 2002) — India, China
 A. wangi Lin & Li, 2020 — China (Hainan)
 A. wuchaoi Lin & Li, 2020 — China
 A. zhuanghaoyuni Lin & Li, 2020 (type) — China

† Deinopedes
† Deinopedes Wunderlich, 2017 — Cretaceous Burmese amber
 † D. tranquillus Wunderlich, 2017

Deinopis

Deinopis MacLeay, 1839
 D. amica Schiapelli & Gerschman, 1957 — Argentina, Uruguay
 D. anchietae Brito Capello, 1867 — West Africa, Angola, South Africa
 D. armaticeps Mello-Leitão, 1925 — Brazil
 D. aspectans Pocock, 1900 — Cameroon, Equatorial Guinea, DR Congo, South Africa
 D. aurita F. O. Pickard-Cambridge, 1902 — Mexico
 D. biaculeata Simon, 1906 — Brazil
 D. bituberculata Franganillo, 1930 — Cuba
 D. bucculenta Schenkel, 1953 — Venezuela
 D. camela Thorell, 1881 — New Guinea
 D. cornigera Gerstaecker, 1873 — Ethiopia, Rwanda, Burundi, Tanzania, South Africa
 D. cylindracea C. L. Koch, 1846 — Colombia
 D. cylindrica Pocock, 1898 — Mozambique, South Africa
 D. diabolica Kraus, 1956 — El Salvador
 D. fasciata L. Koch, 1879 — Australia (Queensland)
 D. fasciculigera Simon, 1909 — Vietnam
 D. fastigata Simon, 1906 — Brazil
 D. giltayi Lessert, 1930 — Congo
 D. granadensis Keyserling, 1879 — Colombia
 D. guasca Mello-Leitão, 1943 — Brazil
 D. guianensis Taczanowski, 1874 — French Guiana
 D. guineensis Berland & Millot, 1940 — Guinea
 D. kollari Doleschall, 1859 — Myanmar, Indonesia (Ambon)
 D. labangan Barrion-Dupo & Barrion, 2018 — Philippines
 D. lamia MacLeay, 1839 (type) — Cuba, Puerto Rico
 D. longipalpula Strand, 1913 — Central Africa
 D. longipes F. O. Pickard-Cambridge, 1902 — Mexico to Panama
 D. luzonensis Barrion-Dupo & Barrion, 2018 — Philippines
 D. madagascariensis Lenz, 1886 — Madagascar
 D. mediocris Kulczyński, 1908 — New Guinea
 D. ornata Pocock, 1902 — Ethiopia
 D. pallida Mello-Leitão, 1939 — Brazil
 D. pardalis Simon, 1906 — Brazil
 D. plurituberculata Mello-Leitão, 1925 — Brazil
 D. ravida L. Koch, 1878 — Australia (Queensland)
 D. reticulata (Rainbow, 1899) — New Guinea
 D. rodophthalma Mello-Leitão, 1939 — Brazil
 D. schomburgki Karsch, 1878 — Australia (South Australia)
 D. schoutedeni Giltay, 1929 — Congo
 D. seriata Simon, 1906 — Brazil
 D. spinosa Marx, 1889 — USA, St. Vincent, Venezuela
 D. subrufa L. Koch, 1878 — Australia (Queensland, New South Wales, Tasmania), New Zealand
 D. tabida L. Koch, 1879 — Australia (Queensland)
 D. tuboculata Franganillo, 1926 — Cuba
 D. unicolor L. Koch, 1878 — Australia (Western Australia)

Menneus

Menneus Simon, 1876
 M. aussie Coddington, Kuntner & Opell, 2012 — Australia (Queensland, New South Wales), New Caledonia
 M. bituberculatus Coddington, Kuntner & Opell, 2012 — Australia (Queensland), possibly New Guinea
 M. camelus Pocock, 1902 — South Africa
 M. capensis (Purcell, 1904) — South Africa
 M. darwini Coddington, Kuntner & Opell, 2012 — Tanzania
 M. dromedarius Purcell, 1904 — South Africa, Madagascar
 M. nemesio Coddington, Kuntner & Opell, 2012 — Australia (New South Wales)
 M. neocaledonicus (Simon, 1888) — New Caledonia
 M. quasimodo Coddington, Kuntner & Opell, 2012 — Australia (Western Australia)
 M. samperi Coddington, Kuntner & Opell, 2012 — East Africa
 M. superciliosus (Thorell, 1881) — Australia (Queensland, New South Wales)
 M. tetragnathoides Simon, 1876 (type) — Angola, Malawi, Tanzania
 M. trinodosus Rainbow, 1920 — Australia (Queensland, New South Wales, Lord Howe Is.)
 M. wa Coddington, Kuntner & Opell, 2012 — Australia (Western Australia)
 † M. pietrzeniukae Wunderlich, 2004

References

Deinopidae